Biker Boyz is a 2003 American sports action drama film, directed by Reggie Rock Bythewood and written by Bythewood and Craig Fernandez, based on the 2000 New Times LA article of the same name by Michael Gougis. The film is about a group of underground motorcycle drag racers, and the intense rivalry between a legendary motorcyclist and a young racing prodigy who has formed his own biker club.

The film features an ensemble cast including Laurence Fishburne, Derek Luke, Meagan Good, Djimon Hounsou, Brendan Fehr, Rick Gonzalez, Larenz Tate, Terrence Howard, Orlando Jones, Salli Richardson, and Kid Rock. It also features Lisa Bonet and Vanessa Bell Calloway.

Biker Boyz was released on January 31, 2003 in the United States by DreamWorks Pictures.

Plot
In the world of underground motorcycle drag racing, the undefeated phenom known as Smoke is the undisputed "King of Cali" fending off challengers who are determined to win Smoke's "crown" and earn the coveted title.

Kid, a novice rider and motorcycle club "prospect", has been assisting his father, mechanic Slick Will, as they prepare Smoke's bike for an evening of racing. In narration, Kid quotes his dad as saying “the difference between men and boys is the lessons they learn” and adds that his father taught him plenty.

Kid practices stunts on the set and meets Tina, while an eager, local biker issues a challenge to Smoke, who accepts. Smoke, casually utilizing “tunnel vision”, wins the race but the challenger loses control when his bike suffers a hydraulics malfunction well over 100 MPH and crashes into a row of parked bikes. Upended, the motorcycle is sent flipping though the air, striking Slick Will and throwing him through a plate storefront window. Both men are instantly killed. At Slick Will's funeral, Smoke leads dozens of bikers from the "Black Knights", to personally offer his condolences to Slick Will’s widow Anita and drops a signed Black Knights flag into his grave. Kid is unimpressed with the gesture and triggered.

Six months later, Kid is now a capable rider with his own custom-powered bike. Winning his first "race" by dangerously interfering in a challenge between a drunken biker and biker Donny, Kid displays his speed and skill, successfully pulling off stunts hinted at earlier. The crowd loves it, much to the dissatisfaction of Smoke. Kid calls Smoke out to challenge but the latter dismisses this and tells the inexperienced youth to get more experience and clout first.

At a diner, Kid meets the “drunk” racer Stuntman where it is revealed that the two are secret hustling partners and they split the winnings. To cover their tracks, fellow biker Primo suggests that the trio form a bike club and after a bit of persuasion they agree. Kid also tracks down Tina, a tattoo artist and the two start a romance.

Kid makes amends to the biker jury consisting of 10 leaders of the most powerful biker gangs. He apologizes for his disrespect, specifically towards their chairman - Smoke and they agree to verify the new club with the trio calling themselves "Biker Boyz". At a local fund raising event, the trio becomes a quintet. Smoke courts an old flame and later, is challenged by leader of the Strays and long-time rival Dogg, and the two wager thousands, their lids (helmets) and the title.

The day of the race, Smoke defeats the aggressive Dogg without issue and afterwards, in late but stunting fashion, the Biker Boyz arrive. Kid trash talks Motherland in an impromptu move to provoke Smoke. Smoke is unamused with Kid’s bid to "make an entrance" and the Black Knights exit. Motherland and Kid race until Police descend upon the finish line and the young racer is arrested. The rest of the bikers manage to escape. A lawyer for the Black Knights bails Kid out and Anita confronts him, threatening to evict Kid from her house if he races again.

The night of the Black Knights annual dance, Kid is challenged by proxy to race Dogg and accepts after a squabble with Tina’s brother and Strays mechanic Wood. Having overheard, Anita finds Smoke before the race and demands that he stop it. Smoke and Anita argue until she relents, telling Smoke that Kid is actually his son and not Slick Will's. Incredulous, Smoke is moved to act and manages to draw Kid into an altercation. Kid attacks Smoke but the veteran confiscates Kid’s keys and knocks him out cold, successfully averting the race.

Recovering at home, Kid confronts Anita, who confesses decades old truths. Enraged and grief stricken, Kid leaves home and moves in with his girlfriend Tina. Kid elects to go rogue and after gaining more followers for his club, gathers his team, declaring "we're gonna win more lids than any crew on the set and we're gonna out hustle every crew off the set" and indicates at reinvention, "Biker Boyz set their own rules."

The Biker Boyz get their own hangout and begin hustling several races, but when Stuntman successfully hustles the nephew of a dangerous biker, he and Primo are ambushed at a party. Kid comes to the rescue but is quickly overpowered by the leader of the other club who pulls a gun. Smoke and a group of Black Knights intervene to settle terms and convince the vengeful bikers to stand down. Smoke and Kid have a sit down at the Biker Boyz spot but Kid is more dismissive and angry as ever. Aggravated, Smoke finally agrees to race Kid, under the condition that whoever loses will never race again; but first Smoke has to allow Kid to race Dogg at the next circuit event. Soon thereafter Kid reconciles with Anita.

At the race track, Kid and his team face the Strays with Smoke and the Black Knights at watch from the stands. Dogg and Kid race down the strip until Dogg does a “bump and run“ causing Kid to “lay the bike down” into a crash. Although Kid is unhurt, his bike is wrecked. Later that day, Smoke informs Kid that the authorities are closing the track, due to the amount of crashes, but he has managed to rent a farm outside of town, securing their race. Kid agrees to arrive the next day.

Later that night, Kid, Primo, and Stuntman are trying unsuccessfully to fix Kid's bike when the Strays arrive to confront them. Wood confirms that the damage is too severe to mend in time for the race. Dogg concedes that only their bikes are as strong and fast as Smoke’s. As a peace offering, Dogg lends Kid his bike, giving the youth a viable shot at winning.

The following day, Black Knights and Biker Boyz arrive and line up in opposing formation in the open field, not unlike an old western showdown. Smoke calls for a fair race, with no nitrous oxide system; Kid wants Tina to call the start. Smoke and Kid race on a dirt road behind the farm and Kid adopts Smoke’s “tunnel vision” with the finish line in sight. On course to win, Smoke is suddenly filled with emotions and instead slows down to let his son win - giving way to Kid becoming the new "King of Cali".

Smoke, impressed and proud, relinquishes the crown to a humbled and respectful Kid who tells Smoke to keep his helmet. The two men reconcile their differences and enjoy an embrace. Kid watches on as his father rides off into the sunset and in narration repeats Slick Will’s sentiment in full context that “the difference between men and boys are the lessons they learn” and adds that his father taught him plenty.

Cast
 Laurence Fishburne as Manuel "Smoke" Galloway
 Derek Luke as Jalil "Kid" Galloway, Anita's Son, Tina's Boyfriend and Smoke's Estranged Son
 Orlando Jones as "Soul Train"
 Djimon Hounsou as "Motherland"
 Nicholas Sheriff as "Kidd Chaos"
 Lisa Bonet as "Queenie"
 Brendan Fehr as "Stuntman"
 Larenz Tate as "Wood"
 Terrence Dashon Howard as "Chu-Chu"
 Kid Rock as "Dogg"
 Rick Gonzalez as "Primo"
 Meagan Good as Tina, Kid's Girlfriend
 Salli Richardson-Whitfield as "Half & Half"
 Vanessa Bell Calloway as Anita Galloway, Kid's Mother and Smoke's Estranged Wife
 Dante Basco as "Philly"
 Kadeem Hardison as T.J
 Dion Basco as "Flip"
 Tyson Beckford as Donny
 Eriq La Salle as William "Slick Will" Galloway, Kid's Stepfather

Featured motorcycles 
 Silver and Magenta 1999 Suzuki Hayabusa GSX1300R: Smoke
 Yellow and silver 2001 Suzuki GSX-R 750: Kid
 Black 2000 Kawasaki Ninja ZX-12R: Dogg
 Red and silver Ducati 996S: Primo
 Silver 2000 Kawasaki Ninja ZX-12R: Kidd Chaos
 Orange 1998 Yamaha R1: Chu Chu
 Silver 2000 Yamaha R1: Stuntman
 Green 1999 Suzuki TL1000R: 1/2 & 1/2
 1982 Kawasaki KZ1000: Soul Train
 2001 Honda CBR1100XX: Motherland
 T-Rex (automobile): T.J.

Development 
Biker Boyz is based loosely on Manuel "Pokey" Galloway the president of Valiant Riders of Pasadena, California.

Laurence Fishburne, Derek Luke, Orlando Jones, Djimon Hounsou, Nicholas Sheriff, Lisa Bonet, Brendan Fehr, Larenz Tate, Terrence Howard, Salli Richardson, Kid Rock, Rick Gonzalez, Meagan Good are all avid bikers in real life.

The real "King Of Cali" made a cameo appearance in the film, in the scene where Kid is in a meeting with the set.

Slick Will really doesn't blink as the bike hits him, as Soul Train states.

Actual motorcycle clubs were on the set as technical advisors, and performed some of the tricks, stunts, and racing. They include Valiant Riders, The Mighty Black Sabbath Motorcycle Club Nation, G-Zer Tribe, Ruff Ryders, Soul Brothers, Total Package, Chosen Few MC, Rare Breed, Brothers of the Sun, Sisters of the Sun, Deuces, and Black Sabbath New Breed.

The Biker Boyz jackets were in part inspired by Nexxunlimited Entertainment (as shown in the end credits).

Soundtrack

A soundtrack containing hip hop, rock and R&B music was released on January 23, 2003, by DreamWorks Records. It peaked at #98 on the Top R&B/Hip-Hop Albums.

Reception

Critical response 
The movie received generally negative reviews. Rotten Tomatoes gives the film a score of 23% based on reviews from 91 critics. The site's consensus states: "Waste of a good cast. For a movie about bike racing, it never gets up to speed."
Metacritic gives the film a score of 36% based on reviews from 27 critics.

Box office 
The film was a Box Office failure, earning a worldwide total of $23.5 million against a $24 million budget.

Home media 
The film was released on DVD & VHS on June 10, 2003 in North America, and on DVD in the United Kingdom on August 21, 2004.

References

External links 
 
 
 Biker Boyz at the Internet Movie Cars Database
 Soul Brothers

2003 films
2003 directorial debut films
2000s action drama films
2000s chase films
2000s hip hop films
2000s road movies
3 Arts Entertainment films
American action drama films
American auto racing films
American chase films
American coming-of-age films
American road movies
African-American films
DreamWorks Pictures films
Films based on newspaper and magazine articles
Films set in California
Films set in Los Angeles
Motorcycle racing films
Motorsport mass media in the United States
2000s English-language films
2000s American films